The Vale Bridge near Vale, South Dakota brings a local road over the Belle Fourche River.  It was built in 1906.  It was listed on the National Register of Historic Places in 1999.

It is a Pratt through truss bridge produced by the Canton Bridge Company. Its main span is a  steel, pin-connected truss.

It is located one mile east and .6 miles north of Vale.

References

Bridges completed in 1906
National Register of Historic Places in Butte County, South Dakota
Bridges in South Dakota
1906 establishments in South Dakota